The Automobile Alley Historic District in Mobile, Alabama is a  historic district which was listed on the National Register of Historic Places in 2016.

It includes 156-157 N. Cedar, 108 N. Dearborn, 100-101 N. Franklin, 156 N. Hamilton, 163 N. Lawrence, 453-701 St. Anthony Sts. in Mobile.

References

External links

Auto rows
Historic districts in Mobile, Alabama
Historic districts on the National Register of Historic Places in Alabama
Motor vehicle buildings and structures on the National Register of Historic Places
National Register of Historic Places in Mobile County, Alabama
Shopping districts and streets in the United States
Transportation buildings and structures on the National Register of Historic Places in Alabama